Kalamkhvaran (also Romanized as Kalamkhvārān; also known as Kalameh Khūrān, Kalameh Khvārān, Kalamkhārān, and Kalman Khvārān) is a village in Jey Rural District, in the Central District of Isfahan County, Isfahan Province, Iran. At the 2006 census, its population was 697, in 189 families.

References 

Populated places in Isfahan County